The following highways are numbered 94:

International
 European route E94

Australia
 National Route 94 in Western Australia
 Burley Griffin Way (New South Wales)
 Dohertys Road (Victoria) (New Route)

Canada
 Newfoundland and Labrador Route 94
 Ontario Highway 94

China 
  G94 Expressway

Germany
 Bundesautobahn 94

Iran
 Road 94

Korea, South
National Route 94

New Zealand
 New Zealand State Highway 94

United States
 Interstate 94
 U.S. Route 94 (former)
 Alabama State Route 94
 Arkansas Highway 94
 California State Route 94
 Colorado State Highway 94
 Connecticut Route 94
 Florida State Road 94
 Georgia State Route 94
 Illinois Route 94
 Illinois Route 94A (former)
 Illinois Route 94B (former)
 Iowa Highway 94
 K-94 (Kansas highway)
 Kentucky Route 94
 Louisiana Highway 94
 Louisiana State Route 94 (former)
 Maine State Route 94
 Maryland Route 94
 M-94 (Michigan Highway)
 Minnesota State Highway 94 (1934–1935) (former)
 Minnesota State Highway 94 (1935–1958) (former)
 Missouri Route 94
 Nebraska Highway 94
 New Jersey Route 94
 County Route 94 (Bergen County, New Jersey)
 County Route S94 (Bergen County, New Jersey)
 New Mexico State Road 94
 New York State Route 94
 County Route 94 (Cattaraugus County, New York)
 County Route 94 (Dutchess County, New York)
 County Route 94 (Madison County, New York)
 County Route 94 (Oneida County, New York)
 County Route 94 (Onondaga County, New York)
 County Route 94 (Rensselaer County, New York)
 County Route 94 (Rockland County, New York)
 County Route 94 (Saratoga County, New York)
 County Route 94 (Steuben County, New York)
 County Route 94 (Suffolk County, New York)
 County Route 94A (Suffolk County, New York)
 County Route 94 (Sullivan County, New York)
 County Route 94 (Westchester County, New York)
 North Carolina Highway 94
 Ohio State Route 94
 Oklahoma State Highway 94
 Pennsylvania Route 94
 Rhode Island Route 94
South Carolina Highway 94 (pre-1937) (former)
 Tennessee State Route 94
 Texas State Highway 94
 Farm to Market Road 94
 Texas State Highway Spur 94 (former)
 Utah State Route 94
 Virginia State Route 94
 West Virginia Route 94
 Wisconsin Highway 94 (former)
 Wyoming Highway 94

See also
A94
D 94 road (United Arab Emirates)
N94
P94